Zubiri is a small village in Navarre, situated on Spain's  N135 with a Romanic bridge across the Arga River. Zubiri is located on the French Way  path of the Camino de Santiago. It is the administrative centre of Esteribar.

Demographics
As with many Navarre towns, Zubiri is a small town. The 2017 census by INE Bureau places them at 435.

Climate

As with the rest of Spain, a humid, warm climate ensues, with temperatures ranging from 6° Celsius to 28° Celsius:

Highways and roads
 N135 main highway to Pamplona
 N138 North of Zubiri, to rural Spain
 Calle Rio Arga Road Major Residential Access.

References

Municipalities in Navarre